Badr (Arabic: بدر) as a given name below is an Arabic masculine and feminine name given to the "full moon on its fourteenth night" or the ecclesiastical full moon.
Badr may refer to:

Places
Badr, Egypt, a city
Badr, Libya, a town in Libya
Badr, Saudi Arabia, a city in Saudi Arabia
Badr Rural District (disambiguation), administrative subdivisions of Iran
Ash-Shaykh Badr, a city in Syria
Battle of Badr, a battle in the early days of Islam
Hala-'l Badr, a volcano in Saudi Arabia
Sheikh Badr, a depopulated village in Jerusalem

People
 Badr (name)

Military
Operation Badr (disambiguation), any of four war operations
Badr-1 (rocket), Yemeni rocket artillery system
Badr-2000, Iraqi proposed ballistic missile

Other
Badr Airlines, based in Khartoum, Sudan
Badr Organization, a political party in Iraq
Badr (satellite), a series of satellites operated by Pakistan, including:
Badr-1, launched in 1990
Badr-B or Badr-2, launched in 2001
Badr-4, an ArabSat satellite
Badr-6, an ArabSat satellite

See also

Bader
Baader
Al-Badr